Gouné Niangadou (born 28 December 1997) is a Malian footballer who plays as a midfielder for Antwerp.

Professional career
On 19 January 2018, Niangadou joined Royal Antwerp F.C. Niangadou made his professional debut with Antwerp in a 3-3 Belgian First Division A tie with K.V. Oostende on 2 April 2018.

International career
Niangadou represented the local Mali national football team for the 2018 African Nations Championship qualification, scoring 1 goal in 4 games.

References

External links
 Soccerway Profile
 FDB Profile
 Royal Antwerp Profile

1997 births
Living people
Sportspeople from Bamako
Malian footballers
Mali youth international footballers
Association football midfielders
Royal Antwerp F.C. players
Stade Malien players
Belgian Pro League players
Malian Première Division players
Malian expatriate footballers
Malian expatriate sportspeople in Belgium
Expatriate footballers in Belgium
21st-century Malian people